Taxpayers' money may refer to:

 Money held by individuals or businesses that are taxpayers
Public funds, all money spent or invested by government to satisfy individual or collective needs or to create future benefits